The Leitrim Post was a local newspaper covering County Leitrim in northwest Ireland. The paper was one of a series published in the region by River Media and stable-mates included the Donegal Post and Sligo Post. For the first half of 2007 the paper's circulation figures averaged at 4,014, The newspaper followed the same template as other papers in the River Media group which focus on lifestyle stories and an emphasis on sport. It was based in Carrick-on-Shannon and competed with another paper called the Leitrim Observer. The Leitrim Post ceased publication in 2009 due to a fall off in advertising revenue and a reduction in staffing levels that left it incapable of competing in the market.

References

2007 establishments in Ireland
2009 disestablishments in Ireland
Carrick-on-Shannon
Defunct newspapers published in Ireland
Mass media in County Leitrim
Newspapers published in the Republic of Ireland
Publications established in 2007
Publications disestablished in 2009
Weekly newspapers published in Ireland